Desmond Anaclitus Rajiva de Silva (ඩෙස්මන්ඩ් ද සිල්වා in [Sinhala]; 13 July 1944 – 9 January 2022), popularly known as Desmond de Silva, was a Sri Lankan singer, background musician and entertainer. Often regarded as the "King of Baila", he is noted for his youthful voice that was said to have changed little over four decades of performing.

Early life
De Silva was born on 13 July 1944 in Matara, Sri Lanka as the eldest of the family with two siblings. His father Clement Arnold de Silva from Matara was a Public Health Inspector (PHI) and mother Olga Correa from Chilaw was a teacher. He had one younger brother (Milroy) and a younger sister (Varena). After moving to Bambalapitiya, he first went to St. Peter's College, Colombo. Then he was boarded at St. Aloysius College due to being stubborn. Later he was sent back to St. Peter's College and finally school life ended at St. Thomas' College, Matara. He did not go to high school and came to Colombo to join the Army. De Silva could not bear the hardships of military life, so he decided to leave. As a result, he left the Army and joined the Air Force. He left the army and became a soil digger at a bank construction site. At that time his daily wage was five rupees.

Singing career
De Silva became a singer at the invitation of a friend. "Des," as he was known to his fans, launched his career in popular music in Colombo in 1963, he was the lead vocalist of the Fire-Flies. His music was featured widely on Radio Ceylon and subsequently the Sri Lanka Broadcasting Corporation, the oldest radio station in South Asia. De Silva also performed with leading Sri Lankan pop groups – "Spitfires," "Gabo and the Breakaways," and the "Jetliners." He sang a song titled 'Oba Nisa' with Mignonne Fernando and the Jetliners – it was hailed as a musical masterpiece at an international song festival. In 1976 he decided to form his own band, "Desmond and the Clan", which performed in various countries in Southeast Asia, including the Maldives. He also represented Sri Lanka at the 5th Olympiad of Songs in Athens, Greece in 1979 and became the champion and at the Yamaha Festival of Song in Tokyo, Japan.

He celebrated 40 years in show business, selling millions of CDs around the world. De Silva was known for his popular renditions of Sri Lankan 'baila' music, which was a style whose origins are in Portuguese and Spanish music. He had a string of baila hits including: Polkatu Hande, Chuda Manike, Mamma No, Miss Sri Lanka, Rajasangabo, Komali Pane as well as popular recordings of anonymous Baila songs. He was also known for a whole range of 'Party Time' non-stop Baila music. De Silva resided in London and performed with London-based backing group Foreign Affairs in the United Kingdom.

De Silva championed the cause of autism spectrum disorders: in August 2005 he was the first Sri Lankan musician to appeal on behalf of autistic children and people with autism in Sri Lanka, urging Sri Lankans to 'speak up for those who cannot speak up for themselves.' De Silva received a standing ovation. He was also a film background singer where he also sang the songs of the film Seetha Devi as well as the baila songs of the films Samanmalee and Mage Amma. He turned to Baila singing because of Wally Bastiansz. De Silva, who became a fan of Wally, one day invited him to his house. He sang some of his songs on the guitar that day and recorded them from his home recorder. Since then, he sang many of Bastiansz' songs such as Yaman bando, and Hai Hui baby Achchi. De Silva also sang record songs and Nadagam songs such as Raja Sangabo Hisa De Dugiyata, Muni Nandana Siripada, Panamure Eth Raja, Amba Damba Naran, Budubawa Pathana Vesathuru Nirinda.

In 1986, De Silva moved to England. On 7 June 2003, he performed in a sold out concert at BMICH titled 'Desmond Live in Concert'. He launched the first ever Concert for Autism for Sri Lanka in Sydney, Australia on 31 March 2006.

Personal life and death
Desmond De Silva married Deanna De Zilwa and they had two sons and a daughter (Steve,Damien and Jacqueline). Eldest son Steve was a Singer/Dancer whose untimely death In a private hospital was due to cancer. He left behind his daughter Megan who has now being adopted by Derrick & Renuka Fernando.

His second marriage was to Dr. Lilamani Wijeratne who was his partner in life for 25 years and with whom he resided in London.

Desmond met and married his third Wife Phyllis Van Houten who he said was the love of his life in Sydney Australia where he has resided for the past 12 years. Desmond & Phyllis were in Melbourne Australia where he performed at a New Year’ Eve Dance.  Phyllis was with him when he died of a heart attack on 9 January 2022 at the age of 77.

Discography
 Baila 20
 Gramaphone Express 
 Chuuda Maanike
 Haadu Hathak
 Komali Pane
 Baila Rajje
 Desmond Silva with Sunflowers

See also 
 Music of Sri Lanka
 Baila
 List of Sri Lankan musicians

References

External links 

World Music Central: Desmond de Silva Autism Fundraiser in Sydney Australia
Autism Sri Lanka: Desmond de Silva Autism Concert in Sydney 
   Desmond de Silva appeals on Autism
Desmond de Silva presents a Lifetime Achievement Award
Listen to Desmond de Silva on Sinhala Jukebox
 Desmond de Silva on Sinhala Songs Page
Desmond de Silva on the Myuru Gee Library
World Music Central Article on Sri Lankan Musicians
Sunday Observer Article on Desmond de Silva's 40 years in Showbiz
Gulf Daily News Bahrain article 
 

1944 births
2022 deaths
20th-century Sri Lankan male singers
21st-century Sri Lankan male singers
Autism activists
Sinhalese singers
Sri Lankan emigrants to the United Kingdom
Sri Lankan health activists
People from Matara, Sri Lanka